(meaning 'a certain glance') is a section of the Cannes Film Festival's official selection. This section was introduced in 1978 by Gilles Jacob.

The section presents 20 films with unusual styles and non-traditional stories seeking international recognition.

winners

Since 2005, the prize consists of €30,000 financed by the Groupama GAN Foundation.

Other  awards

References and notes

Cannes Film Festival
Lists of films by award